John Martel (fl. 1713–1718, first name occasionally James and originally Jean) was a French pirate active in the Caribbean.

History

Martel began his career as a privateer during the War of Spanish Succession, turning to piracy after the Treaty of Utrecht ended the war. By September 1713 he was active off Jamaica taking several ships with his 8-gun, 80-man sloop. He soon traded up to larger ships, keeping the best for his growing fleet. He forced a number of captured sailors to serve on his ships but let most of his captives go. At one point he swapped with the master of a captured ship, taking his vessel but giving him a prize ship in trade and setting him free.

With his new 22-gun, 100-man flagship and four other vessels he put into St. Croix in late 1716 to resupply and careen. Jamaican officials were tipped off to his location and dispatched the warship  under Francis Hume to hunt him down. Hume found Martel's flotilla in January 1717. After sinking one of the pirate sloops and demolishing the shore batteries they had set up, Hume anchored offshore. Martel tried making a run for it in his flagship but ran aground in the attempt. He ordered the ship burned (with some captured slaves still aboard) and fled to a captured sloop, in which he and a few of his crew made their getaway. The remainder of his crew hid on the island as Hume looted and hauled away the remaining ships.

Later that month Samuel Bellamy and his partner Paulsgrave Williams put into St. Croix to repair and resupply when they were hailed by sailors from ashore. They were the remainder of Martel's crew and soon joined Bellamy, who sailed away before HMS Scarborough could return. Blackbeard is often cited as having fought Scarborough, though Royal Navy logs never mention such an incident; it is generally believed that later writers conflated Blackbeard's close encounter with HMS Seaford and Martel's fight against Scarborough.

Hume was rewarded for the action against Martel and others with command of the much larger warship HMS Bedford. Martel himself disappears after escaping Hume; some sources claim he accepted King George I's general pardon offered in late 1717 to all pirates who surrendered within a year.

See also
 Stede Bonnet, who accompanied Blackbeard to St. Croix some time later.
 Lord Archibald Hamilton, Governor of Jamaica who dispatched Hume in Scarborough to hunt down pirates.

References

18th-century pirates
Year of birth missing
Year of death missing
French pirates
French privateers
Caribbean pirates
Sea captains
Maritime folklore
Pardoned pirates